"What's It Gonna Be" is a song by American recording artist Beyoncé. It was written by Beyoncé, Kandice Love, and Soul Diggaz production team members LaShaun Owens, Karrim Mack, and Corte Ellis for her debut studio album, Dangerously in Love (2003), while production on the track was overseen by Beyoncé and Soul Diggaz. A funk and neo soul song, "What's It Gonna Be" takes a direct sample from 2Pac's posthumous 1997 single, "I Wonder If Heaven Got a Ghetto", which in turn, samples "Two of Us" (1978) by the band, Cameo.
The song was not included on the final track listing of the album but appears as a bonus track on the Japanese edition of Dangerously in Love. It also appeared on the additional audio disc of her live album Live at Wembley, which was released in 2004. "What's It Gonna Be" was released to US iTunes Store as a digital single on July 29, 2003, through Columbia Records. Website Allmusic praised the composition, writing that it "rips honeyed harmonies over a funky beat."

Formats and track listings
Digital download
"What's It Gonna Be" – 3:35

References

2003 songs
Beyoncé songs
Funk songs
Songs written by Beyoncé
Song recordings produced by Beyoncé